Daredevil is a character appearing in American comic books published by Marvel Comics. Created by writer-editor Stan Lee and artist Bill Everett, with an unspecified amount of input from Jack Kirby, the character first appeared in Daredevil #1 (April 1964). Writer/artist Frank Miller's influential tenure on the title in the early 1980s cemented the character as a popular and influential part of the Marvel Universe. Daredevil is commonly known by such epithets as "Hornhead", "The Man Without Fear", and "The Devil of Hell's Kitchen".

Daredevil is the alias of Matthew Michael "Matt" Murdock, a blind lawyer. His origins stem from a childhood chemical accident that gave him special abilities. While growing up in the historically gritty or crime-ridden working class Irish-American neighborhood of Hell's Kitchen in New York City, Matt Murdock is blinded by a radioactive substance that falls from an out-of-control truck after he pushes a man out of the path of the oncoming vehicle. While he can no longer see, his exposure to the radioactive material heightens his remaining senses beyond normal human ability, and gives him a "radar sense." His father, a boxer named Jack Murdock, is a single man raising his now blind son, who despite his rough upbringing, unconditionally loves his son and tries to teach him to form a better life for himself. Jack is later killed by gangsters after refusing to throw a fight, leaving Matt an orphan. To protect himself, Matt began training to hone his physical abilities and superhuman senses under the tutelage of a mysterious blind stranger named Stick, eventually becoming a highly skilled and expert martial artist.

Some years later, after graduating from law school with high grades, Matt seeks out the criminal element in Hell's Kitchen and starts his crime-fighting activities. Matt targets the local gangsters who murdered his father and succeeds in bringing them to justice. Eventually, donning a costumed attire modeled after a devil, Matt took up a dual life of fighting against the criminal underworld in New York City as the masked vigilante Daredevil, which put him in conflict with many super-villains, including his arch-enemies Bullseye and the Kingpin. He also becomes a skilled and respected lawyer after graduating from Columbia Law School with his best friend and roommate, Franklin "Foggy" Nelson, with whom he becomes law partners, forming the law firm Nelson & Murdock. After pretending to have a sighted identical twin brother named Mike Murdock, who Matt would claim was Daredevil whenever his identity was made public knowledge, and occasionally impersonate, Mike is brought into existence following an encounter with a reality-warping mutant, before cementing his existence alongside Matt in history with a magic spell.

Daredevil has since appeared in various forms of media, including several animated series, video games and merchandise. The character was first portrayed in live action by Rex Smith in the 1989 television film The Trial of the Incredible Hulk, and then by Ben Affleck in the 2003 film Daredevil. Charlie Cox portrays the character in the Marvel Cinematic Universe (MCU) media franchise, appearing thus far in the Marvel Television series Daredevil (2015–2018), the miniseries The Defenders (2017), the Marvel Studios film Spider-Man: No Way Home (2021) and the Disney+ television series She-Hulk: Attorney at Law (2022), while being set to appear in the upcoming series Echo (2023), and Daredevil: Born Again (2024).

Publication history

1960s

The character debuted in Marvel Comics' Daredevil #1 (cover date April 1964), created by writer-editor Stan Lee and artist Bill Everett, with character design input from Jack Kirby, who devised Daredevil's billy club. Writer and comics historian Mark Evanier has suggested without confirmation that Kirby also designed the basic image of Daredevil's initial costume, though Everett modified it. That original costume design was a combination of black, yellow, and red, reminiscent of acrobat tights.

The first issue covered both the character's origins and his desire for justice on the man who had killed his father, boxer "Battling Jack" Murdock, who raised young Matthew Murdock in the Hell's Kitchen neighborhood of Manhattan, New York City. Jack instills in Matt the importance of education and nonviolence with the aim of seeing his son become a better man than himself. In the course of saving a blind man from the path of an oncoming truck, Matt is blinded by a radioactive substance that falls from the vehicle. The radioactive exposure heightens his remaining senses beyond normal human limits, and giving him a kind of "radar" sense, enabling him to detect the shape and location of objects around him. To support his son, Jack Murdock returns to boxing under the Fixer, a known gangster, and the only man willing to contract the aging boxer. When he refuses to throw a fight because his son is in the audience, he is killed by one of the Fixer's men. Having promised his father not to use violence to deal with his problems, Matt gets around that promise by adopting a new identity who can use physical force. Adorned in a yellow and black costume made from his father's boxing robes and using his superhuman abilities, Matt confronts the killers as the superhero Daredevil, unintentionally causing the Fixer to have a fatal heart attack.

Wally Wood introduced Daredevil's modern red costume in issue #7, which depicts Daredevil's battle against the far more powerful Sub-Mariner, and has become one of the most iconic stories of the series.

Daredevil would embark on a series of adventures involving such villains as the Owl, Stilt-Man, the Gladiator, and the Enforcers. In issue #16 (May 1966), he meets Spider-Man, a character who would grow to become one of Daredevil's closest friends. A letter from Spider-Man unintentionally exposed Daredevil's secret identity, compelling him to adopt a third identity as his twin brother Mike Murdock, whose carefree, wisecracking personality much more closely resembled that of the Daredevil guise than the stern, studious, and emotionally-withdrawn Matt Murdock did. The "Mike Murdock" plotline was used to highlight the character's quasi-multiple personality disorder (he at one point wonders whether Matt or Mike/Daredevil "is the real me"), but it proved confusing to readers and was dropped in issues #41–42, with Daredevil faking Mike Murdock's death and claiming he had trained a replacement Daredevil. The series' 31-issue run by writer-editor Stan Lee and penciler Gene Colan (beginning with issue #20) includes Daredevil #47, in which Murdock defends a blind Vietnam veteran against a frameup; Lee has cited it as one of the favorite stories of his career.

Matt discloses his secret identity to his girlfriend Karen Page in issue #57.  However, the revelation proves too much for her, and she is depicted as breaking off the relationship. This was the first of several long-term breakups between Matt and Karen, who would nevertheless prove the most enduring of his love interests.

1970s
Gerry Conway took over as writer with issue #72, and turned the series in a pulp science fiction direction: a lengthy story arc centered on a robot from thousands of years in the future trying to change history. Even long-standing arch-villain the Owl was outfitted with futuristic weaponry and vehicles. Conway also moved Daredevil to San Francisco beginning with Daredevil #86, and simultaneously brought on the Black Widow as a co-star for the series. The Black Widow served as Daredevil's crime-fighting ally as well as his love interest from issue #81–124 (Nov. 1971–Aug. 1975), of which #93-108 were titled Daredevil and the Black Widow.

Jann Wenner, the co-founder and publisher of the Rolling Stone music magazine appeared in Daredevil #100 (June 1973) by Gerber and Colan.

The writing and editing jobs went to Marv Wolfman with issue #124, which wrote the Black Widow out of the series and returned Daredevil to Hell's Kitchen. Wolfman promptly introduced the lively but emotionally fragile Heather Glenn to replace the Black Widow as Daredevil's love interest. Wolfman's 20-issue run included the introduction of one of Daredevil's most popular villains, Bullseye, and a story arc in which the Jester uses computer-generated images to manipulate the mass media.

With issue #144, Jim Shooter became the writer and introduced Paladin in issue #150 (Jan. 1978). Shooter had difficulty keeping up with the schedule, and the writing chores were shortly turned over to Roger McKenzie.

McKenzie's work on Daredevil reflected his background in horror comics, and the stories and even the character himself took on a much darker tone: Daredevil battled a personification of death, one of his archenemies was bifurcated by a tombstone, and a re-envisioning of Daredevil's origin showed him using stalker tactics to drive the Fixer to his fatal heart attack. McKenzie created chain-smoking Daily Bugle reporter Ben Urich, who deduces Daredevil's secret identity over the course of issues #153–163, and had Daredevil using the criminal underworld of Hell's Kitchen as an information network, adding several small-time crooks to the supporting cast.

Halfway through his run, McKenzie was joined by penciler Frank Miller with issue #158 (May 1979).

In a story arc overlapping Wolfman, Shooter, and McKenzie's runs on the series, Daredevil reveals his identity to Glenn and becomes partially responsible for the suicide of her father; their relationship would persist but would prove increasingly harmful to both of them. Though the Black Widow returned for a dozen issues (#155–166) and attempted to rekindle her romance with Daredevil, he ultimately rejects her in favor of Glenn.

1980s
Miller disliked Roger McKenzie's scripts, so new editor Denny O'Neil fired McKenzie so that Miller could write the series.

Miller continued the title in a similar vein to McKenzie. Resuming the drastic metamorphosis the previous writer had begun, Miller took the step of essentially ignoring all of Daredevil's continuity prior to his run on the series; on the occasions where older villains and supporting cast were used, their characterizations and history with Daredevil were reworked or overwritten. Most prominently, dedicated and loving father Jack Murdock was reimagined as a drunkard who physically abused his son Matt, entirely revising Daredevil's reasons for becoming a lawyer. Spider-Man villain Kingpin was introduced as Daredevil's new primary nemesis, displacing most of his large rogues gallery. Daredevil himself was gradually developed into something of an antihero. In issue #181 (April 1982), he attempts to murder Bullseye by throwing him off a tall building; when the villain survives as a quadriplegic, he breaks into his hospital room and tries to scare him to death by playing a two-man variation on Russian roulette with a secretly unloaded gun.

Following up a suggestion from O'Neill that he give Daredevil a realistic fighting style, Miller introduced ninjas into the Daredevil canon, bringing a martial-arts aspect to Daredevil's fighting skills, and introducing previously unseen characters who had played a major part in his youth: Stick, leader of the ninja clan; the Chaste, who had been Murdock's sensei after he was blinded; a rival organization of assassins called the Hand; and Elektra, an ex-girlfriend and sometime member of the Hand. This was a drastic change for a character once called "the sightless swashbuckler."  Elektra was killed by Bullseye in issue #181 (April 1982).

After #191 Miller left the series. O'Neil switched from editor to writer. He continued McKenzie and Miller's noir take on the series, but backed away from the antihero depiction of the character by having him not only spare Bullseye's life but express guilt over his two previous attempts to kill him. Miller returned as the title's regular writer, co-writing #226 with O'Neil. Miller and artist David Mazzucchelli crafted the acclaimed "Born Again" storyline in #227–233. In the Born Again storyline, Karen Page returns as a heroin-addicted porn star, and sells Daredevil's secret identity for drug money. The Kingpin acquires the information and, in an act of revenge, orchestrates a frameup that costs Murdock his attorney's license. Miller ended the arc on a positive note, with Murdock reuniting with both Karen Page and Maggie, the mother he thought dead, now a nun.

Ann Nocenti later became the series's longest-running regular writer, with a four-and-a-quarter-year run from #238–291 (Jan. 1987 – April 1991).

The team returned Murdock to law by co-founding with Page a nonprofit drug and legal clinic, while Nocenti crafted stories confronting feminism, drug abuse, nuclear proliferation, and animal rights-inspired terrorism. She introduced the antagonist Typhoid Mary, and in issues #262–265 used the Inferno event as a backdrop for the collapse of Daredevil's life: the clinic is destroyed, Page goes missing after learning that Matt has had an affair with Mary Walker, and Walker reveals herself as the alter ego of Typhoid Mary. Murdock subsequently becomes a drifter in upstate New York, an especially controversial move in Nocenti's run, as it marked the first time the character had been taken outside of an urban environment. She ended her run with a positive turn in Murdock's fortunes: he returns to Hell's Kitchen, regains his sense of self, reconciles with Foggy Nelson, and resolves to seek out Karen Page.

1990s
New writer D. G. Chichester continued from where Nocenti left off, with Murdock resuming his friendship with Foggy Nelson, struggling to re-win the heart of Karen Page, appealing the revocation of his attorney's license, and bonding more deeply than ever with Hell's Kitchen. Chichester's focus on Daredevil's relationship with New York City went so far as to have two issues devoted entirely to Daredevil defending New Yorkers from ordinary criminals and even simple accidents. The critically acclaimed "Last Rites" arc from #297–300 saw Daredevil regaining his attorney's license and finally bringing the Kingpin to justice.

Frank Miller returned to the character and his origins with the 1993 five-issue Daredevil: The Man Without Fear miniseries. With artist John Romita Jr., Miller expanded his retcon of the life and death of Murdock's father, "Battling Jack" Murdock, and Murdock's first encounters with the Kingpin and Foggy Nelson. The role of Stick in the genesis of Daredevil was expanded, as was Murdock's doomed love affair with Elektra.

The creative team of Chichester and penciler Scott McDaniel changed the status quo with their "Fall From Grace" storyline in issues #319–325 (Aug. 1993 – Feb. 1994). Elektra, who was resurrected in #190 but had not been seen since, finally returned. An injured Daredevil creates a more protective costume from biomimetic materials: red and gray with white armor on the shoulders and knee pads. Revamped billy clubs could attach to form nunchucks or a bo staff. His secret identity becomes public knowledge, leading to him fake his own death and assuming the new identity of "Jack Batlin". This new identity and costume last for several story arcs, while Murdock finds a way to convince the world that he is not, in fact, secretly Daredevil (courtesy of a double). A short stint by J. M. DeMatteis returned Daredevil to his traditional red costume and Matt Murdock's identity.

Under writers Karl Kesel and later Joe Kelly, the title gained a lighter tone, with Daredevil returning to the lighthearted, wisecracking hero depicted by earlier writers. Matt and Foggy (who now knows of Matt's dual identities) join a law firm run by Foggy's mother, Rosalind Sharpe.

In 1998, Daredevils numbering was rebooted, with the title "canceled" with issue #380 and revived a month later as part of the Marvel Knights imprint. Joe Quesada drew the new series, written by filmmaker Kevin Smith. Its first story arc, "Guardian Devil", depicts Daredevil struggling to protect a child whom he is told could either be the Messiah or the Anti-Christ. Murdock experiences a crisis of faith exacerbated by the discovery that Karen Page has AIDS (later revealed to be a hoax) and her subsequent death at Bullseye's hands. When he discovers that the true party responsible for the scheme is Mysterio, who is currently dying of cancer, he leaves Mysterio to commit suicide, deciding to use the money Karen left him in her will to re-open Nelson & Murdock.

Smith was succeeded by writer-artist David Mack, who contributed the seven-issue "Parts of a Hole" (vol. 2, #9–15). The arc introduced Maya Lopez, also known as Echo, a deaf martial artist.

2000s
David Mack brought colleague Brian Michael Bendis to Marvel to co-write the following arc, "Wake Up" in vol. 2, #16–19 (May 2001 – August 2001), which follows reporter Ben Urich as he investigates the aftereffects of a fight between Daredevil and the new Leap-Frog.

The 2001 Daredevil: Yellow miniseries presented another take on Daredevil's origins using letters written to Karen Page after her death. The series depicts the early rivalry between Matt Murdock and Foggy Nelson for Page's affection, and incorporates many events depicted in the earliest issues of Daredevil. The supervillains the Owl and the Purple Man appear as antagonists. In this story, Daredevil credits Page with coining the phrase "The Man Without Fear", and she suggests to Daredevil he wear all maroon instead of dark red and yellow.

Issue #26 (December 2001) brought back Brian Michael Bendis. Developments in this run included the introduction of romantic interest and future wife Milla Donovan, the outing once again of Murdock's secret identity, the reemergence of the Kingpin, and Daredevil's surrender to the FBI.

The impact of his exposure as Daredevil continued to be used as a plot point by both Bendis and writer Ed Brubaker and artist Michael Lark, who became the new creative team with Daredevil vol. 2, #82 (Feb. 2006).

Brubaker's first story arc had a new character masquerading as Daredevil in Hell's Kitchen. Murdock later discovered the ersatz Daredevil is his friend Danny Rand, the superhero Iron Fist.

The series returned to its original numbering with issue #500 (Oct. 2009), which followed vol. 2, #119 (Aug. 2009). New writer Andy Diggle revised the status quo, with Daredevil assuming leadership of the ninja army the Hand. Daredevil later appeared in the one-shot  Dark Reign: The List – Daredevil.

2010s
Following this came the crossover story arc "Shadowland", in which it is revealed that Daredevil's recent actions after taking control of the Hand are the result of him being possessed by a demon. Purged of the demon by his allies, Murdock departs New York, leaving his territory in the hands of the Black Panther in the briefly retitled series' Black Panther: Man Without Fear #513. Murdock finds himself renewed in the miniseries Daredevil: Reborn #1–4 (March–July 2011), where he confronts a drug dealer with the power to make his opponents live their darkest fears, Murdock reaffirming his role as the man without fear as he confronts his enemy's taunts and resolves to return to New York.

In July 2011, Daredevil relaunched with vol. 3, #1 (Sept. 2011), with writer Mark Waid. Waid focused on emphasizing the character's powers and perception of the physical world. In the premiere issue, Murdock finds he can no longer serve as a trial lawyer due to past allegations of his being Daredevil causing a case he represents in court to turn into a media circus. Two issues later, Nelson and Murdock have developed a new business strategy of serving as consulting counselors, by teaching clients how to represent themselves in court. Daredevil joins the New Avengers in a story written by former Daredevil series writer Brian Michael Bendis. Daredevil appeared as a regular character in the 2010–2013 New Avengers series in issues #16–34 (November 2011 – January 2013). At one point, Foggy begins to question Matt's sanity, ultimately leading to a fallout between the two. They reconcile once the truth is discovered. Daredevil vol. 3 ended at issue #36 in February 2014, in which Matt is forced to publicly reveal his Daredevil identity, resulting in his being disbarred by New York and prompting him to again relocate to San Francisco.

Waid and Chris Samnee followed this up with Infinite Comics' Daredevil: Road Warrior weekly digital miniseries, which focused on an adventure during Matt's trip to San Francisco. It was reprinted as issue 0.1 in Daredevil volume 4, which launched under Waid and Samnee with a new issue #1 (March 2014) as part of the All-New Marvel NOW! storyline centered on Matt's new life in San Francisco.

Daredevil volume 4 ended with issue #18 in September 2015. A new volume began as part of the All-New, All-Different Marvel branding, written by Charles Soule with art by Ron Garney with the first two issues released in December 2015. In this series, Matt returns to New York, where he now works as an Assistant District Attorney. He had a redesigned costume and a new apprentice in Samuel Chung, an undocumented immigrant who has been living in New York's Chinatown since he was a child, who has taken up the codename Blindspot. Flashbacks in a later story arc reveal how Matt regained his secret identity; when the Purple Children acquired a machine designed by their father to enhance his powers after Matt had saved them from a mob, they used the machine to erase the world's knowledge of Matt's identity as Daredevil, Matt only allowing Foggy to know his secret identity afterward, enabling him to be re-instated as a New York Attorney. Using his restored secret identity, Murdock is able to take advantage of a subsequent court case to establish a precedent for superheroes testifying in court without the need to expose their secret identities. Despite interference from the Kingpin, Murdock succeeds in taking this precedent to the Supreme Court so that all superheroes will have the same rights in future cases, and afterward returns to his traditional red costume.

Following the release of Issue 28, much like with other Marvel series as part of the Marvel Legacy event, the Daredevil series renumbered, as if it had never been relaunched, with #595 which was released on November 8, 2017, where Daredevil's longtime nemesis the Kingpin became the Mayor of New York City and begins a campaign to make costumed vigilantes officially criminals. Although Murdock's attempt to set up a sting operation results in his allies being arrested when the Kingpin turns this trap against him, Fisk's legal manipulations work against him when he is attacked by the Hand, leaving Fisk in a coma and Murdock legally mayor of New York from his position as deputy mayor due to a loophole added by a prior administration that had not been amended, allowing Matt to take control of the city and release his fellow heroes to help him stop the Hand.

Charles Soule released his final Daredevil storyline "Death of Daredevil" during the October and November 2018 releases, in a 4-part bimonthly release which ended the series. Afterwards the series went on hiatus for two months and resumed distribution in February 2019, with a brand-new volume written by Chip Zdarsky. The primary artist on the series is Marco Checchetto. This new volume follows Daredevil's return to crime-fighting as he accidentally kills a robber during an arrest, leading him to doubt his status as a hero and to a confrontation with Spider-Man. Murdock later abandons his Daredevil persona and focuses on his job as a parole officer, feeling that Daredevil does not bring justice and only harms the Hell's Kitchen community. His mantle is taken up by several vigilantes trying to replace Daredevil, eventually leading Murdock to don a black variation of Daredevil's outfit and fight against the mob, which has taken over Hell's Kitchen, usurping Wilson Fisk's control over the district.

2020s
After he helps save Hell's Kitchen, Daredevil, still in his mask, gives himself up to police custody, stating that he wants to stand trial for his crimes but will only do so on the condition his identity is never revealed. He voluntarily confesses to the killing and is sentenced to a prison term. While Matt serves his time, Elektra takes up the Daredevil costume and protects Hell's Kitchen at his behest. In the prison, Murdock grapples with the idea that Daredevil and Matt Murdock work together to put people in prison, which he comes to see as ruining people's lives without reforming them or setting them on the right path.

In August 2021, it was confirmed that volume 6 of the series would end in November 2021, at Issue #36. The series lead into the crossover event "Devil's Reign" with the same creative team. Following the conclusion of that series, another Daredevil series, also written by Zdarsky, was launched in July 2022.

Powers and abilities

Although the character is blind, his remaining four senses function with superhuman accuracy and sensitivity, giving him abilities far beyond the limits of a sighted person. Few characters know that the hero cannot see. Daredevil developed a Radar-Sense, as well as echolocation. Writer/co-creator Stan Lee said that he was worried that blind people would be offended at how far he exaggerated the way a blind person's remaining senses are enhanced, but that his fears were assuaged by letters from organizations such as The Lighthouse for the Blind which said that blind people greatly enjoyed having Daredevil comics read to them.

The Beyonder once restored Daredevil's eyesight, but, suspecting a trick on the Beyonder's part, Daredevil immediately insisted that his blindness be restored. Beyonder agreed.

When Frank Miller expanded most of Daredevil's abilities, he attempted to make them "extraordinary enough to be exciting, but not on par with Superman", noting Superman's distinctly unbelievable powers. When Miller joined the title in 1979, the first thing he did to the character was "revamp" his radar sense and made it less distinct and more believable; he wanted Daredevil to have the "proximity" sense that some martial artists claim to have. Due to the character's sensitive sense of touch, Daredevil can read by passing his fingers over the letters on a page though laminated pages prevent him from reading the ink. Daredevil has commonly used his superhuman hearing to serve as a polygraph for interrogation by listening for changes in a person's heartbeat. This ability can be fooled if the other person's heart is not beating at a natural rate, such as if they have an artificial pacemaker.

Just as Daredevil's other senses are stronger, they are also sensitive; his main weakness is his vulnerability to powerful sounds or odors that can temporarily weaken his radar sense. This weakness is often used to immobilize Daredevil. Alternately, the lack of taste or smell of certain substances can be used against him, as in one instance of a hallucinogenic drug designed so that Daredevil could not tell he was drugged. His senses are highly acute, capable of sensing the minor atmospheric disturbance created moments before a teleporting character appears. People with superhuman speed, such as Spider-Man, are too fast to be detected and targeted by his radar sense.

While his radar sense mostly compensates for his blindness, it has certain limitations. He cannot perceive color without touch, and he can only read printed matter if the ink is raised enough for his sense of touch.  Most photographs, televisions, and computer screens are blank to him. However, the radar sense has shown on numerous occasions the ability to "see" through walls and fabrics. The radar sense also grants him an omnidirectional field of vision. These two latter abilities are the most notable advantages the radar has over normal vision.

Though he has no superhuman physical attributes beyond an enhanced sense of balance, Daredevil is a master of martial arts. Having been trained by Stick, Daredevil is a master hand-to-hand combatant. He uses elements from a wide variety of martial arts, including Ninjutsu, Aiki Jūjutsu, Aikido, Judo, Karate, Jujitsu, Kung Fu, Silat, Capoeira, Wrestling, and Stick Fighting combined with American-style Boxing while making full use of his Olympic-level gymnastic capabilities.

Daredevil's signature weapon is his specially designed baton, which he created. Disguised as a blind man's cane in civilian garb, it is a multi-purpose weapon and tool that contains 30 feet of aircraft-control cable connected to a case-hardened steel grappling hook. Internal mechanisms allow the cable to be neatly wound and unwound, while a powerful spring launches the grapnel. The handle can be straightened for use when throwing. The club can be split into two parts, one of which is a fighting baton, the other of which ends in a curved hook.

In his civilian identity, Murdock is a skilled and respected New York attorney. He is a skilled detective, tracker, and interrogation expert, as well as being an expert marksman.

After his identity was publicly exposed and he was forced to relocate to San Francisco, Matt Murdock's secret identity as Daredevil was restored by the Purple Children, the children of his old foe the Purple Man. From the description given by the Purple Children, their influence renders it impossible for anyone to determine Daredevil's secret identity through deductive research unless he actually tells them who he is under the mask, or someone unmasks him.

Supporting characters
Throughout the core Daredevil series, many characters have had an influence in Matt Murdock's life. His father, "Battlin' Jack" Murdock instills in Matt the importance of education and nonviolence with the aim of seeing his son become a better man than himself. He always encouraged Matt to study, rather than fight like him. Jack forbade his son from undertaking any kind of physical training. It is his father's murder that prompts the super-powered character to become a superhero, fighting gangsters. He was trained by an old blind ninja master named Stick following his childhood accident.

Matt Murdock's closest friend is Franklin "Foggy" Nelson, his college roommate, sidekick, and law partner. Their relationship in the early years of the series was fraught with tension due to Nelson's sense of inferiority to Murdock as a lawyer and as a target for the affections of their secretary, Karen Page. They frequently argued over Murdock's preference for defending supervillains, as Nelson's enthusiasm is for corporate law. The pudgy and fallible Nelson has often been used by writers for lightheartedness and even comic relief. As a superhero, one of Daredevil's best friends is the hero Spider-Man; with his enhanced senses, Murdock was able to physically identify Spider-Man on their first meeting, and Spider-Man in turn learned his secret identity some time after. Due to the events of the "One More Day" storyline, Daredevil no longer knows Spider-Man's secret identity. Spider-Man also initially lost all memory of Daredevil's secret identity following the  Purple story arc, but regained it at the beginning of the Red Fist story arc.<ref>Daredevil (Vol. 7) #1</ref> Iron Fist would later become one of his greatest friends, and at one point took on the role of Daredevil himself. Jessica Jones, a former superhero turned private investigator acts as a bodyguard for Matt Murdock in his civilian life. Her husband, Luke Cage, is a friend of Daredevil as well. Maya Lopez, a deaf woman and skilled martial artist, is a friend of Daredevil after he fought her and convinced her that he did not murder her father because she was being manipulated by the Kingpin, who was responsible. Ben Urich, a reporter for the Daily Bugle discovered Daredevil's identity and eventually becomes his friend as well, though during his identity dispute Daredevil decided to end his "secret professional relationship" with Urich to avoid getting Urich mixed up in his problems and being used against him. The Punisher, anti-hero Frank Castle, is one of Daredevil's reluctant allies, as well as his antagonist due to their different philosophies in crime-fighting.

Daredevil has a convoluted and often tortured love life. One of Daredevil's more notable love interests is Elektra, an assassin who would later be killed and later resurrected. He also had a short-lived romantic relationship with Black Widow who for a time also served as his crime-fighting partner while they both were in San Francisco until she broke it off because she did not want to feel like a sidekick; despite this they remain as close confidantes. In the 2000s, Murdock marries a woman named Milla Donovan, although one of Daredevil's enemies drives her to insanity.

Enemies

In his early years, Daredevil fought a number of costumed supervillains, the first of these being Electro, a prominent Spider-Man foe, in Daredevil #2. A number of recurring villains would be introduced over the years, such as the Owl, the Purple Man, Mr. Fear, Stilt-Man, Gladiator, the Jester, the Man-Bull, and Death-Stalker. The supervillain duo of the Cobra and Mr. Hyde have frequently clashed with Daredevil, and Hyde has fought Daredevil alone on several occasions. The psychotic assassin Bullseye was introduced by Marv Wolfman in issue #131, and was a frequent antagonist over the next six years of the series.

Beginning with Frank Miller's run on Daredevil, his traditional rogues' gallery was used less often, and The Kingpin became Daredevil's arch-enemy. Like the Purple Man, Death-Stalker, Assassin, and several others, the Kingpin has long known Daredevil's secret identity. His run as the series's central villain ended with issue #300, but he continues to menace Daredevil on occasion. Elektra made her debut as a bounty hunter, and though her time as part of Daredevil's rogues' gallery was brief (spanning barely a year of the series), her romantic past with him is an important part of the mythos. In Daredevil #254, Ann Nocenti introduced Typhoid Mary, an assassin for the Kingpin with dissociative identity disorder (the diagnostic term for multiple personalities), who would become a prominent Daredevil foe.

Other versions
1602
In Neil Gaiman's Marvel 1602, set in Earth-311, Matthew Murdoch  (known as The Bard) is introduced as a blind balladeer. Secretly he is an adventurer for hire, who charges excessive prices to anyone who has the money, for any job. Matthew, as a child, was a fearless boy who would explore anywhere. One day he discovered a dark cave that glowed inside from a green substance. As a boy Matthew thought nothing of tasting it, and so he did to know what it was. He soon walked back the way he came. His mother later found him with a fever and discovered that her son is completely blind. Though he lost his sight, the rest of Matthew's senses became enhanced with superhuman sharpness. Matthew traveled as a blind beggar and poet, singing songs of heroes, and appearing weak and helpless. His true nature would be revealed when he was either on a job for a client or attacked.

The Queen of England's head spymaster, Nicholas Fury, had hired him to hunt down and protect Donal, the Templar keeper of Thor’s staff. On the way to meet Donal he encountered a woman named Natasha (aka the Black Widow), whom he referred to as the most dangerous woman in Europe. His analysis of Natasha proved to be very accurate when she betrayed him by smashing a bottle over his head and pushing Matthew off a bridge into a canyon below. Murdoch survived, and appeared again in a dark cave just in time to save Donal from being attacked by Natasha's men. Matthew attempts to rescue Donal from her by taking him as far away as he could. But Natasha had the cave entrance surrounded with a garrison of men, sent by Count Otto von Doom of Latveria to capture the old man's treasure, Donal, and Matthew Murdoch. Doom imprisons them in one of his castle's cells and works to uncover the secrets of the golden bauble that Donal gave to him to distract him from the true treasure: the staff. Donal is also in contact with Doctor Strange, the former Queen's court magician and physician, who informs them that a group of heroes are on their way to the castle.

When the imprisoned Captain of the Fantastic Four rails against his stone prison, it shakes the castle from its foundations and frees Murdoch and Donal. Murdoch uses his abilities to carry the old man and leap from wall to wall to the courtyard many feet below. When Doom's men corner them, after Donal demands to find his staff, the old man uses it to transform himself into the Thunder God, Thor. Thor uses his immortal powers to stop Doom's men and assist Carlos Javier’s witchbreed in their attack on Doom's castle, finally allowing Doom to use Thor's electricity to explode the golden sphere that Donal had given him, scarring Doom and bringing him to the brink of death. While Donal-as Thor-joins the group aboard their ship, headed to the New World to fix the tear in their universe, Murdoch uses his own means to leave Latveria.

Murdoch later appears to King James, in the dark, threatening to cut his throat if he ever attacked the late Queen's spymaster, Fury. He then disappears through the window, promising to return again if James is untrue to his word, and with a final warning not to touch his home land of Ireland.

2099
 Marvel Knights Daredevil 2099 is Samuel Fisk, a grandson of Wilson Fisk, who feels some remorse over his grandfather's actions, and carries on the legacy of Daredevil, as well as the Kingpin legacy he inherited.
 The one-shot 2099 A.D. Genesis (Jan. 1996) introduced a Marvel 2099 version of Daredevil, opposing the corporate criminals of Alchemax in a futuristic New York. His real identity is Eric Nelson, grandson of Matt Murdock's longtime associate Franklin "Foggy" Nelson.

Age of Apocalypse
In the Age of Apocalypse timeline (Earth-295), Keeper Murdock serves Mikhail Rasputin, one of Apocalypse's Four Horsemen. Exposure to toxic waste during his time in one of Apocalypse's labor camps for humans caused Murdock's blindness and powers, though he believed his powers were granted by an implant given to him by Rasputin. When he accidentally touched the incapacitated Empath, he realized the error of his ways, he then put Empath out of his misery by beating him to death with his Billy Club.
Renouncing Mikhail, Murdock ripped off his visor and realized that his enhanced senses were not the result of his cybernetic augmentation. Murdock broke down upon realizing how many years Mikhail had been manipulating him.

Ten years later, Murdock is seen working for Weapon Omega, Apocalypse's replacement. He serves as the keeper of New Apocalypse city, using his sense to monitor humans who try to enter the city. He is seen hunting for Harper Simmons and fights with Prophet hand to hand but was defeated with a poison gas that allowed Prophet escape with the X-Terminators.

Amalgam
In the Amalgam Comics universe, Slade Murdock is a blind mercenary in New Gotham City acting under the name of "Dare the Terminator", because of the dares she takes, and that few dare to challenge her. Dare is a female combination of Daredevil and DC Comics' Deathstroke the Terminator.

Another Daredevil amalgam is mentioned, called Deaddevil, the Man Without Life and is apparently Daredevil merged with Deadman.

House of M
In the House of M crossover, Matt Murdock/Daredevil is romantically involved with She-Hulk. The origins and the extent of his powers are never explained, but is very much similar to his mainstream counterpart. It is also unknown if he gained the fighting skills from his radioactive senses, or if they were gained when Layla Miller "awakened" him.

Earth X
In the Earth X series, there are at least three different alternative "Daredevils". First, in an interesting visual pun, Kurt Wagner eventually goes back in time to become the red-skinned demon Belasco. But ultimately, when he becomes a hero again, he goes to Hell's Kitchen (the original Daredevil's old stomping grounds), to become the neighborhood protector.

Secondly, in the afterlife, Matthew Murdock is shown as part of the Avenging Host.

Thirdly (and most prominently) an invulnerable stunt man, thought by the Thing to be Deadpool, goes by the name of Daredevil, as well as donning a costume that looks somewhere between that of Daredevil and Evel Knievel. This version craves his own death. Ben Grimm repeatedly tries to guess at Daredevil's identity, guessing Deadpool at first and then a string of other obscure Marvel characters, but Daredevil denies being any one of them. Eventually Machine Man confronts Daredevil and reveals that he was never any previously known Marvel character - he is an original character from the Earth X universe.

End of DaysDaredevil: End of Days is a 2013 eight-issue comic book miniseries that chronicled Daredevil's final days. During his final battle with Bullseye, Daredevil whispers the single word "Mapone" to Bullseye before being killed by a blow to the head by his own billy-club. Several years before his death, Daredevil had confronted the Kingpin when he returned to Hell's Kitchen.  Fisk had made a deal with the government and Daredevil, seeing no other options to stop Fisk, killed him in front of many people on the streets. After killing Fisk, Daredevil disappeared many years until his final battle with Bullseye, having either alienated from or shunned by his friends and fellow superheroes. Matt had been training Tim Urich, the adopted son of longtime friend Ben Urich, to become the new Daredevil. After finishing Tim's training and becoming aware of Bullseye's return to Hell's Kitchen, Daredevil returned to prevent any more of his past enemies to affect his successor. His actions during his final battle drove Bullseye mad with curiosity over the word "Mapone", leading him to commit suicide.

It is revealed that Matt had fathered a daughter named Mapone Romanova with the Black Widow.  After Natasha's death, Matt and Mapone seemingly became estranged. Matt was also allegedly the father of four other children with several of his past lovers: Elektra Natchios has a son also named Matthew, Milla Donovan has a son named Franklin, and Mary Walker is the mother of twin boys.

Exiles
The Daredevil from Earth-181 is an assassin working for his reality's Kingpin.

Earth-13584
On Earth-13584, Daredevil appears as a member of Spider-Man's gang.

Secret Wars
During the "Secret Wars" storyline, different versions of Daredevil appear on Battleworld.

 In "Howard the Human," a mouse version of Matt Murdock named Mouse Murdock appears in the Battleworld domain of New Quack City. Mouse Murdock assists Howard the Human by telling him the murdered informant Howard was investigating was playing possum for Wilson Fisk (who is a gorilla). Fisk sends monkey ninjas after them, but Murdock defeats them all and then gives him the location on the possum's whereabouts.
 In the Battleworld domain of Limbo, Matt is married to Karen. He is put under a spell by Mephisto before the evening of the final Inferno into thinking about Typhoid Mary and is attacked by Mephisto who was disguised as her. Karen saves Matt by cutting off Mephisto's head and they share a final kiss as the world starts falling apart.

Marvel Mangaverse
The Marvel Mangaverse features a version of Daredevil called the Devil Hunter. His costume is patterned after an oni, or Japanese demon.

Marvel Zombies universe
Daredevil appears in the limited series Marvel Zombies vs. The Army of Darkness. While still un-zombified, he is seen fighting the villain Thunderball. Ash, misunderstanding, unexpectedly helps Thunderball win the fight.

Daredevil also appears in Marvel Zombies: Dead Days. He shows up on the scene to save a terrified Nova from the zombified Spider-Man, saying that they have to kill Spider-Man immediately. Ironically, he becomes a zombie when Spider-Man bites him on the back because Nova is too scared to assist him.

In the limited Marvel Zombies series, Daredevil is among those who chase and eventually eat Magneto, but not before Magneto hurls an I-beam completely through his torso. It is assumed that he is eventually destroyed after several zombies gain the Power Cosmic and incinerate all the other zombies.

MC2

In the alternative timeline published under the MC2 imprint, Daredevil is murdered by the Kingpin while saving the life of Kaine. Kaine attempts to revive Daredevil by sorcery, but inadvertently bonds both Daredevil's soul and the demon Zarathos to Reilly Tyne, who becomes the superhero Darkdevil.

Mutant X
The alternative universe version of Daredevil in the Mutant X series wears a similar costume to the character of the same name published by Lev Gleason Publications during the 1940s as an homage.

Old Man Logan
In the storyline Old Man Logan in an alternative future on Earth-807128, fifty years after the superheroes lost a great battle, two young men dressed as Daredevil and the Punisher are found chained together on a pole by a new Kingpin, who has killed Magneto in the past, after an attempted mission to free the town from him. The man dressed as Daredevil asks for the whereabouts of Spider-Man's granddaughter Ashley Barton, who is also the daughter of the Avenger Hawkeye. The new Kingpin states that he is still thinking of what to do with her and that Daredevil and the Punisher got off easy. They are then eaten by Velociraptors.

In Old Man Hawkeye, the prequel to the original "Old Man Logan" arc, Matt is revealed to be one of the few heroes left alive. After the villains conquered most of the planet, Matt escaped to the Himalayas and formed his own dojo while taking on his master's alias, "Stick." When Clint Barton loses his vision following an attack by Avalanche, he seeks out Stick's help to learn how to cope with his blindness so he continue the fight against Red Skull, Matt agrees to help him.

In the pages of "Old Man Logan" that takes place on Earth-21923, Enchantress fought She-Hulk, Daredevil, and Moon Knight. After Punisher killed Electro, Enchantress casts a spell that caused the sounds to be amplified enough for Daredevil's senses to go into overload enough for his head to explode.

Noir
In Daredevil Noir, part of the Marvel Noir imprint, Matt Murdock was blinded by his father's assassin who brutally slammed his head into a brick wall, leaving him blind. Though he did wish to become a lawyer, his impoverished lifestyle denied it, leaving him to be a performer instead, under the name Daredevil. Later he took to the streets as a vigilante, killing criminals to avenge those they killed.

Runaways
In a Runaways alternative future, Daredevil is a member of Heroine's team of Avengers.

Ruins
In the two issue Warren Ellis limited series Ruins, a newspaper headline reveals that Matthew Murdock was fatally injured when an atom truck crashed spilling a radioactive substance in his face. Thus he never became Daredevil.

Spider-Ham
The talking animal comic book Spider-Ham from the Marvel children's-comics imprint Star Comics included versions of Daredevil named "Deerdevil" and "Deviled Ham".

Spider-Gwen

Matt Murdock serves as the main antagonist for most of Spider-Gwen. His ninja training, law background, and powers are the same as his mainstream counterpart. However, he eventually becomes this world's version of the Kingpin and constantly antagonizes Gwen Stacy, who is the Spider-Woman of this dimension.

Teenage Mutant Ninja Turtles (Mirage Studios)
The story of the Teenage Mutant Ninja Turtles in the original comics is that they were four newborn pet turtles owned by a young boy who were splashed by a mutagenic compound and dropped in the sewers when their owner was involved in an accident involving a truck carrying said compound. The circumstances of their creation was intentionally designed to resemble Daredevil's origin, with the scenes even being drawn similarly. The creators of the comic later confirmed that the boy was intended to be a young Matt Murdock, explaining Daredevil's own abilities as the result of exposure to the mutagen.

Ultimate Marvel

The Ultimate Marvel version of Daredevil (Matt Murdock) has appeared in two different limited series, Ultimate Daredevil and Elektra written by Greg Rucka, and Ultimate Elektra, a team to take down the Kingpin. It is revealed in Ultimate Spider-Man #109 that his father Jack was a boxer killed by the Kingpin (a.k.a. Wilson Fisk) when Jack would not throw a match. Later, after the Kingpin burns down Murdock's law offices, a crazed Daredevil breaks into Fisk's apartments and threatens to murder the comatose Vanessa Fisk, but is convinced not to by Spider-Man.

During Magneto's flooding of New York during Ultimatum in which millions of people are killed, Daredevil was found dead by Spider-Man and Hulk.

Ray Connor
A new exclusive iteration of Daredevil (Ray Connor) appears in Ultimate Comics: Avengers. He is discovered and trained by Stick after experiencing an accident similar to the one that gave his predecessor powers. On a somewhat related note, Conner is a fan of Spider-Man. Sometime after being publicly known as the new Daredevil, he and Stick are attacked by Vampire X's vampires and turned. Luring the Avengers to their sewer, Daredevil bites Captain America. Just when Daredevil was about to kill Blade, Captain America teleports the Triskelion to the desert of Iran using the deceased Perun's hammer, leaving Ray's fate unknown but presumably dead.

What If
In What If Everyone Knew Daredevil Was Blind?, Electro realized Daredevil's secret when he assisted Spider-Man in a fight, Electro noticing that Daredevil was not bothered when he triggered a particularly intense flash of light. Although Matt tried to continue as normal, when the Owl attacked Daredevil with weapons designed specifically to exploit Matt's heightened senses, Matt decides to undergo a risky operation to restore his sight. When exposure to another dose of radioactive waste deprived Matt of his enhanced senses while leaving him with his sight, after defeating the Owl's attempt to stage a mock trial, Matt decided to retire from his costumed career and run for district attorney.

In What If Karen Page had Lived?, when Karen survives Bullseye's attempt to kill her as part of Mysterio's last scheme, the fear of losing her drove Matt to beat the Kingpin to death for his role in the scheme. Despite his friends' defense, Matt was sentenced to 44 years in prison for Fisk's murder, but was left alone in prison due to the other prisoners' fear, and was often consulted by Nick Fury on legal matters. He was eventually released after 15 years for good behavior. However, in the beginning of the comic book, it is revealed  that the entire story is the speculation of the main Marvel Universe version of Brian Michael Bendis, the writer himself, who makes a cameo as narrator.

Reception

 Accolades 
 In 2008, Wizard Magazine ranked Daredevil 21st in their "200 Greatest Comic Characters of All Time" list.
 In 2011, IGN ranked Daredevil 10th in their "Top 100 Comic Book Heroes" list.
 In 2018, Vanity Fair included Daredevil in their "Stan Lee’s Most Iconic Characters" list.
 In 2018, GameSpot ranked Daredevil 11th in their "50 Most Important Superheroes" list.
 In 2019, Empire ranked Daredevil 37th in their "50 greatest comic-book characters" list.
 In 2019, Comicbook.com ranked Daredevil 10th in their "50 Most Important Superheroes Ever" list.
 In 2022, CBR.com ranked Daredevil 1st in their "10 Most Powerful Lawyers In Marvel Comics" list, and 9th in their "Marvel's 10 Best Infiltrators" list, and 10th in their "10 Most Iconic Comic Book Nicknames" list.
 In 2022, Screen Rant included Daredevil in their "10 Best Street-Level Heroes In Marvel Comics" list, in their "10 Most Powerful Lawyers In Comics" list, and in their "MCU: 10 Most Desired Fan Favorite Debuts Expected In The Multiverse Saga" list.
 In 2023, CBR.com ranked Daredevil 1st in their "5 Most Successful Marvel Hero Redesigns" list.

 Impact CBR.com announced that Daredevil was ranked 3rd across their "Top 511 Marvel Characters" poll in January 2008.

In other media
Television
 Live-action 
 In 1975, Angela Bowie secured the TV rights to Daredevil and the Black Widow for a duration of one year and planned a TV series based on the two characters, with Bowie herself as the latter and Ben Carruthers as the former. She received help from photographer Terry O'Neill and Natasha Kornilkoff on wardrobes before shopping the project around to producers, but it never came to fruition.
 In 1983, ABC planned a Daredevil pilot. Academy Award-winning writer Stirling Silliphant completed the draft of the program, but it was not aired.
 Daredevil appears in The Trial of the Incredible Hulk, portrayed by Rex Smith. This version was inspired by a police officer to become a hero. Additionally, he wears a black ninja-like outfit, a variation of which would later appear in Frank Miller and John Romita Jr.'s 1993 Daredevil: The Man Without Fear miniseries and the Marvel Television series Daredevil. When David Banner gets arrested, Matt Murdock helps prove his innocence. Murdock later tells Banner his origins before fighting Wilson Fisk with the Hulk's help.

Animation
 Matt Murdock appears in a flashback in the Spider-Man and His Amazing Friends episode "Attack of the Arachnoid", voiced by Frank Welker.
 In the 1980s, ABC had planned a Daredevil television series that would have featured a guide dog named "Lightning the Super-Dog".Comics Feature #33 (1985), cited in:  Television writer Mark Evanier said in 2008 that he was the last in a line of writers to have written a pilot and series bible, with his including Lightning as a guide dog without superpowers.
 Daredevil appears in Spider-Man: The Animated Series, voiced by Edward Albert. This version's blindness occurred after he accidentally witnessed his father Jack Murdock taking part in crime.
 Daredevil appears in the Fantastic Four episode "And a Blind Man Shall Lead Them", voiced by Bill Smitrovich.
 Production stills for a proposed Daredevil animated series meant to air on Fox Kids were made.

Film
 Daredevil appears in a self-titled film, portrayed by Ben Affleck.
 Daredevil makes a cameo appearance in a deleted scene in the spin-off film Elektra, which was later included in the director's cut, portrayed again by Ben Affleck.
 A young Matt Murdock, based on the Spider-Gwen incarnation, makes a non-speaking cameo appearance in Spider-Man: Into the Spider-Verse as the adopted son of the Kingpin.

Marvel Cinematic Universe

In November 2013, Disney and Marvel announced that a new Daredevil television series set in the Marvel Cinematic Universe would be released exclusively on Netflix. Then-Disney CEO Bob Iger stated that if Marvel's Netflix TV shows such as Daredevil become popular, "It's quite possible that they could become feature films". In December 2013, Marvel confirmed that Drew Goddard would be the executive producer and showrunner for the series, and would write and direct the first episode. By May 2014, Goddard had departed as showrunner, being replaced by Steven S. DeKnight, while Goddard was to remain with the show as a consultant. Later that month, Charlie Cox was cast in the starring titular role. Filming began in July 2014. The first season was released in April 2015, the second season was released on March 18, 2016, and the third and final season was released on October 19, 2018. Cox also reprises the role in The Defenders, a crossover miniseries.

In December 2021, Marvel Studios president Kevin Feige announced that Cox will reprise his role in future MCU projects produced by the studio. Cox reprises his role as Murdock in the film Spider-Man: No Way Home (2021), wherein he successfully clears Peter Parker's name from Mysterio's death and subtly attempts to get Happy Hogan to hire him by both describing himself as and telling Hogan he will need "a really good lawyer" to defend him against allegations of stealing technology from Stark Industries. The film does not reference his superhero identity beyond a brief display of his enhanced senses when he catches a brick thrown through the Parkers' window. According to Tom Holland, Murdock's appearance was written after filming began due to uncertainty about the rights to include the Marvel Netflix characters.

On March 17, 2022, an issue of Production Weekly reported that Marvel Studios was developing a Daredevil reboot project, with Kevin Feige and Chris Gray attached as producers. Production is expected to begin either in late 2022 or 2023. The following month, Cox was revealed to have also joined the cast of the Disney+ television series Echo (2023) alongside his Daredevil co-star Vincent D'Onofrio, who had recently reprised the role of Wilson Fisk / Kingpin in the series Hawkeye (2021). Later in May, the Daredevil reboot was confirmed to be taking the form of a new series in development for Disney+, with Matt Corman and Chris Ord attached as the series' head writers and executive producers according to Variety. The series was also described by The Hollywood Reporter as a continuation of the events of the prior show as opposed to a full reboot.

On July 24, 2022, it was announced at San Diego Comic-Con that Charlie Cox would reprise his role voicing an alternate version of Daredevil in Spider-Man: Freshman Year, an animated series exploring a variant Peter Parker's origin story and early days as Spider-Man under the tutelage of Norman Osborn. He was also confirmed to be reprising his role in She-Hulk: Attorney at Law (2022), as well as in his own series: a revival of the Netflix series entitled Daredevil: Born Again (2024).

Video games
 Daredevil makes a cameo appearance in Venom/Spider-Man: Separation Anxiety.
 Daredevil appears as a playable character in Spider-Man: Web of Fire, voiced by Dee Bradley Baker.
 Daredevil appears in Spider-Man (2000), voiced again by Dee Bradley Baker.
 Daredevil appears as the title character of the Daredevil film tie-in game.
 Daredevil appears as a playable character in Marvel Nemesis: Rise of the Imperfects, voiced by David Kaye.
 Matt Murdock makes a cameo appearance in The Punisher, voiced by Steve Blum.
 Daredevil appears as an unlockable character in Marvel: Ultimate Alliance, voiced by Cam Clarke.
 Daredevil appears as a playable character in Marvel: Ultimate Alliance 2, voiced by Brian Bloom. In the PS2, PSP and Wii versions, he serves as a boss for the Pro-Registration campaign.
 Matt Murdock makes a cameo appearance in Chris Redfield's ending for Marvel vs. Capcom 3: Fate of Two Worlds. Additionally, he appears in the Shadowland stage for Ultimate Marvel vs. Capcom 3 and as a card in the Heroes vs. Heralds mode. Moreover, the Marvel Zombies incarnation of Daredevil makes a cameo appearance in Frank West's ending.
 Daredevil appears as a playable character in Marvel Super Hero Squad Online, voiced again by Brian Bloom.
 Daredevil appears in LittleBigPlanet via the "Marvel Costume Kit 1" DLC.
 Daredevil appears as a playable character in Marvel: Avengers Alliance.
 Daredevil appears as a playable character in Marvel Heroes, voiced again by Brian Bloom.
 Daredevil appears as a playable character in Lego Marvel Super Heroes, voiced again by Steven Blum.
 Daredevil appears as a playable character in Marvel Contest of Champions.
 Daredevil appears as a playable character in Marvel: Future Fight.
 Daredevil appears as a playable character in Lego Marvel's Avengers, voiced by Roger Craig Smith.
 Daredevil appears as a playable character in Marvel: Avengers Alliance 2.
 Daredevil appears as a playable character in Marvel Strike Force. This version is a member of the Defenders and Shadowlands teams. His default costume is based on his appearance in the Daredevil television series while his Shadowlands outfit appears as an alternate skin.
 Daredevil appears as a playable character in Marvel Ultimate Alliance 3: The Black Order, voiced again by Brian Bloom.
 Daredevil appears as a playable character in Marvel Puzzle Quest.
 Daredevil appears as a purchasable outfit in Fortnite Battle Royale.
 Daredevil appears in Marvel Snap''.

Merchandise
 Daredevil received a figure in the Secret Wars toy line despite not appearing in the miniseries of the same name.
 Daredevil in his red and yellow-and-black suits, based on Marvel Editor-in-Chief Joe Quesada's representation, received figures in the "Spider-Man Classics" line.
 Daredevil, based on Ben Affleck's portrayal, received a figure in the Marvel Legends toy line.
 Daredevil in his red and yellow-and-black suits received figures in the Marvel Legends Showdown sub-line.
 Daredevil received a figure in The Classic Marvel Figurine Collection.
 Daredevil received a figure in the Marvel Universe line.

Miscellaneous
 Daredevil received a figure in the HeroClix miniatures game.
 Daredevil was announced for the Marvel Crisis Protocol miniatures game.

See also
 List of Daredevil titles
 1964 in comics
 Animal echolocation
 Ben Underwood
 Daredevil (Lev Gleason Publications)

References

External links
 
 
 
 Marvel Toonzone: Daredevil
 Daredevil cover gallery
 Daredevil at Comic Book Database

Avengers (comics) characters
Characters created by Bill Everett
Characters created by Stan Lee
Comics characters introduced in 1964
Daredevil (Marvel Comics) characters
Fictional American lawyers
Fictional blind characters
Fictional boxers
Fictional characters from Manhattan
Fictional Christians
Fictional Columbia University people
Fictional criminologists
Fictional defense attorneys
Fictional Irish American people
Fictional ninja
Fictional Ninjutsu practitioners
Fictional stick-fighters
Fictional torturers and interrogators
Marvel Comics American superheroes
Marvel Comics characters with superhuman senses
Marvel Comics film characters
Marvel Comics male superheroes
Marvel Comics martial artists
Marvel Comics mutates
Marvel Comics orphans
Vigilante characters in comics